Euxoa murdocki is a species of cutworm or dart moth in the family Noctuidae. It is found in North America.

The MONA or Hodges number for Euxoa murdocki is 10846.

References

Further reading

 
 
 

Euxoa
Articles created by Qbugbot
Moths described in 1890